The ecclesiastical region of Campania is one of the sixteen ecclesiastical regions of the Catholic Church in Italy. It consists of three ecclesiastical provinces, twenty-two dioceses, one territorial prelature, and two territorial abbeys. Its territory roughly corresponds with the Italian Republic homonymous region's one.

The ecclesiastical region today

Statistics 
Area (km²): 13.879
Inhabitants: 5.911.843
Parishes: 1.821
Number of secular priests: 2261
Number of regular priests: 1307
Number of permanent deacons: 489

Subdivision 
This ecclesiastical region is made up of twenty-five dioceses:
 Metropolitan Archdiocese of Naples (ecclesiastical province), whose suffragan districts are:
 Diocese of Acerra
 Diocese of Alife-Caiazzo
 Diocese of Aversa
 Archdiocese of Capua
 Diocese of Caserta
 Diocese of Ischia
 Diocese of Nola
 Territorial Prelature of Pompei
 Diocese of Pozzuoli
 Diocese of Sessa Aurunca
 Archdiocese of Sorrento-Castellammare di Stabia
 Diocese of Teano-Calvi
 Metropolitan Archdiocese of Benevento (ecclesiastical province), whose suffragan districts are:
 Diocese of Ariano Irpino-Lacedonia
 Diocese of Avellino
 Diocese of Cerreto Sannita-Telese-Sant'Agata de' Goti
 Territorial Abbey of Montevergine
 Archdiocese of Sant'Angelo dei Lombardi-Conza-Nusco-Bisaccia
 Metropolitan Archdiocese of Salerno-Campagna-Acerno (ecclesiastical province), whose suffragan districts are:
 Archdiocese of Amalfi-Cava de' Tirreni
 Territorial Abbey of La Trinità della Cava
 Diocese of Nocera Inferiore-Sarno
 Diocese of Teggiano-Policastro
 Diocese of Vallo della Lucania

Episcopal Conference of Campania 
 President: Cardinal Crescenzio Sepe, Archbishop of Naples
 Vice President: Luigi Moretti, Archbishop of Salerno-Campagna-Acerno
 Secretary: Antonio Di Donna, Bishop of Acerra

External links 
 

Christianity in Campania
Campania